Remo Marco Freuler (born 15 April 1992) is a Swiss professional footballer who plays as a midfielder for Premier League club Nottingham Forest and the Switzerland national team.

Club career
Freuler began his youth career with FC Hinwil and moved to fellow Zürich side FC Winterthur in 2005. Freuler made his professional debut with Winterthur at the age of 18 in 2010, making two substitute appearances at the end of the 2009–10 Swiss Challenge League. That summer, Freuler was transferred to Grasshopper Club Zürich, where he spent most of the season with the under-21 side. He did spend a stint with the professional club toward the beginning of the Super League season, and got on the scoresheet against rivals FC Zürich. Freuler was frozen out of the team the following season, and was loaned back to Winterthur in the winter break.

Winterthur
Freuler joined a Winterthur side in tenth place in the Challenge League after the first half of the season, just two points above the relegation zone. He made 14 appearances that season for Winterthur, highlighted by his first career goals for the club in the form of a brace against Kriens on 4 March 2012, and Winterthur finished in fourth place. Freuler started all but two games in the 2012–13 season as Winterthur finished in third. Freuler's contract with Winterthur was made permanent in the summer, and he made 21 more appearances with the club the next season before moving to Super League side FC Luzern.

Luzern
On 18 February 2014, Freuler was transferred to Luzern, and he made his club debut on 2 March against St. Gallen under manager Carlos Bernegger. Freuler scored his first goal for the club against Young Boys on 6 April, and Luzern finished the 2013–14 season in fourth place.

Freuler scored seven goals and provided five assists the following season for Luzern, who made a resurgence under new manager Markus Babbel following a mid-season sacking of Bernegger and finishing the first half of the season bottom of the table. Freuler started every game of the new season under Babbel before being transferred to Italian club Atalanta B.C.

Atalanta

On 19 January 2016, Freuler moved to Atalanta for a €2 million transfer fee, and he made his Serie A debut on 7 February against Empoli. After being substituted off against Sampdoria the next week, Freuler was an unused substitute by manager Edy Reja the next seven matches until making his return to the starting eleven two months later against Roma. After the match, an Italian journalist gave him the nickname Iceman, which Freuler said was "because I was so calm on the ball". He scored his first goal for the Bergamo side on 2 May against eventual runners-up Napoli.

Freuler made 29 starts in the 2016–17 season, in which Atalanta finished fourth in the table, a nine place improvement under first-year manager Gian Piero Gasperini. Atalanta also qualified for the group stages of the Europa League for the first time since 1990. Freuler found his name on the scoresheet five times, and also provided four assists. On 28 April, Freuler scored a late equaliser at home to eventual champions Juventus, derailing their chance to clinch the Scudetto that weekend.

Freuler made his first Europa League group stage appearance against English side Everton, playing the full 90 minutes in a 3–0 victory over the Toffees. He had previously played in a second round qualification two-legged tie against Scottish club St Johnstone for Luzern. He opened his scoring account in the 2017–18 season with Atalanta against Fiorentina, scoring an equaliser in the fourth minute of stoppage time on 24 September 2017.

Nottingham Forest
On 14 August 2022, Freuler joined newly-promoted Premier League club Nottingham Forest, leaving Atalanta after six and a half seasons.

International career
Freuler came through the youth setup in Switzerland before being called up to the senior squad for the first time during Switzerland's 2018 World Cup qualifying campaign. He was included in the Switzerland national team 23-man squad for the 2018 World Cup.

In May 2019, he played in 2019 UEFA Nations League Finals, where his team finished 4th.

Freuler was named in the 26-man Swiss squad for the postponed UEFA Euro 2020. On 2 July 2021, in the quarter-final against Spain, he contributed the assist for Xherdan Shaqiri's equalizing goal, but was later sent off in the 77th minute following a decision many pundits thought was too harsh. The match ended 1–1 and went to a penalty shoot-out, in which Spain progressed to the semi-finals.

Style of play
Freuler mainly plays as a central midfielder for club and country. He is considered an effective and versatile player who recovers the ball, tackles well and has a good range of passing. Il Giorno correspondent Fabrizio Carcano described him as "the conductor of the orchestra" due to his high footballing intelligence.

Career statistics

Club

International

Scores and results list Switzerland's goal tally first, score column indicates score after each Freuler goal.

References

External links

Profile at the Nottingham Forest F.C. website

1992 births
Living people
People from the canton of Glarus
Swiss men's footballers
Switzerland youth international footballers
Switzerland under-21 international footballers
Switzerland international footballers
Association football midfielders
Swiss Super League players
Swiss Challenge League players
FC Winterthur players
Grasshopper Club Zürich players
FC Luzern players
Serie A players
Atalanta B.C. players
Premier League players
Nottingham Forest F.C. players
2018 FIFA World Cup players
UEFA Euro 2020 players
2022 FIFA World Cup players
Swiss expatriate footballers
Swiss expatriate sportspeople in Italy
Expatriate footballers in Italy
Expatriate footballers in England
Swiss expatriate sportspeople in England